Amara bifrons is a species of beetle of the genus Amara in the family Carabidae.It is native to Europe.

References

bifrons
Beetles described in 1810